Charles or Charlie Robison may refer to:

Charles Robison (singer) (1890–1957), American country music singer and songwriter; also known as Carson Robison
Charlie Robison (born 1964), American country music singer and songwriter
Charles Robison, American public official; in 2017 replaced John Walsh (U.S. senator) at Montana's USDA Rural Development

See also
Charles Robinson (disambiguation)